The  is the work clothing of Japanese Buddhist monks, worn when engaged in .

Made from cotton or linen and traditionally dyed brown or indigo to distinguish them from formal vestments,  are worn by monks of most Japanese Buddhist traditions performing labour duty such as temple maintenance and field work.

In modern times they have become popular as general casual or work wear. Modern-day  players, because of the instrument's historical association with Zen Buddhism, sometimes wear .

 are often worn by many farmers, and home owners when performing general landscaping and gardening tasks as well.

See also

References 

Japanese full-body garments
Buddhist religious clothing
Japanese words and phrases